The Last of Us Part II is a 2020 action-adventure game developed by Naughty Dog and published by Sony Interactive Entertainment for the PlayStation 4. Set five years after The Last of Us (2013), the game focuses on two playable characters in a post-apocalyptic United States whose lives intertwine: Ellie, who sets out in revenge for a murder, and Abby, a soldier who becomes involved in a conflict between her militia and a religious cult. The game uses a third-person perspective; the player must fight human enemies and cannibalistic zombie-like creatures with firearms, improvised weapons, and stealth.

Development of The Last of Us Part II began in 2014, soon after the release of The Last of Us Remastered. Neil Druckmann returned as creative director, co-writing the story with Halley Gross. The themes of revenge and retribution were inspired by Druckmann's experiences growing up in Israel. Ashley Johnson reprises her role as Ellie, while Laura Bailey was cast as Abby. Their performances included the simultaneous recording of motion and voice. The developers pushed the technical capabilities of the PlayStation 4 during development. Gustavo Santaolalla returned to compose and perform the game's score. Development reportedly included a crunch schedule of 12-hour workdays.

Following some delays, partly due to the COVID-19 pandemic, The Last of Us Part II was released on June 19, 2020. It received critical acclaim, with praise for its gameplay, audio design, score, performances, characters, and visual fidelity, though its narrative and themes divided critics. It was the subject of review bombing on Metacritic, with some players criticizing the story and characters; discourse surrounding the game became adversarial. Part II is one of the best-selling PlayStation 4 games and the fastest-selling PlayStation 4 exclusive, with over four million units sold in its release weekend, and over ten million by 2022. It won more than 320 Game of the Year awards and received multiple other accolades from awards shows and gaming publications.

Gameplay 

The Last of Us Part II is an action-adventure game played from a third-person perspective featuring elements of the survival horror genre. The player traverses post-apocalyptic environments such as buildings and forests to advance the story. The player can use firearms, improvised weapons, and stealth to defend against hostile humans and cannibalistic creatures infected by a mutated strain of the Cordyceps fungus. Control intermittently switches between Ellie and Abby; the player also briefly controls Joel in the opening sequence. The nimble nature of the player character introduces platforming elements, allowing the player to jump and climb to traverse environments and gain advantages during combat. The player can break glass objects such as windows to access certain areas or obtain supplies. Some areas are navigated by horse or boat.

In combat, the player can use long-range weapons such as rifles and bows, and short-range weapons such as pistols and revolvers. The player is able to scavenge limited-use melee weapons such as machetes and hammers, and throw bricks and bottles to distract or attack enemies. Collected items can be used to upgrade weapons at workbenches or craft equipment such as health kits, Molotov cocktails, and makeshift silencers. The player can collect supplements to upgrade skills in a skill tree; training manuals found throughout the environment unlock additional skill tree branches, allowing upgrades to attributes such as the health meter, crafting speed, and ammunition types.

Though the player can attack enemies directly, they can also use stealth to attack undetected or sneak past them. "Listen Mode" allows the player to locate enemies through a heightened sense of hearing and spatial awareness, indicated as outlines visible through walls and objects. In the cover system, the player can crouch behind obstacles to gain advantages in combat, and can also crawl in a prone position to evade enemies. Hostile enemies use artificial intelligence; they may take cover or call for assistance, and can take advantage when the player is distracted, out of ammunition, or in a fight. The player may be impaled by an arrow, which will progressively decrease their health meter and disables Listen Mode until removed when in cover. Player companions, such as Dina, assist in combat by killing enemies or announcing their location.  The game also introduces guard dogs that track the player's scent, which can be visualized in Listen Mode.

Plot 

Joel Miller (Troy Baker) confesses to his brother Tommy (Jeffrey Pierce) his responsibility in preventing the Fireflies attempting to find a cure for the Cordyceps fungus pandemic by saving Ellie (Ashley Johnson) from an operation that would have killed her. Four years later, Joel and Ellie have built a life in Jackson, Wyoming, though their relationship has become strained. While on patrol, Joel and Tommy rescue a stranger, Abby Anderson (Laura Bailey), from an Infected horde. They return to an outpost being used as a temporary hideout by Abby's group, former Fireflies now part of the Washington Liberation Front (WLF), a militia group based in Seattle, Washington. The group attack Joel and Tommy; Abby seeks revenge against Joel for killing her father, the Firefly surgeon (Derek Phillips) who was to perform the operation on Ellie. Meanwhile, Ellie and her girlfriend Dina (Shannon Woodward) leave Jackson in search of the brothers. Ellie enters the WLF outpost and witnesses Abby beat Joel to death. She swears revenge.

Tommy sets out for Seattle to hunt Abby, and Ellie and Dina follow him. After escaping a WLF ambush, Ellie reveals her immunity to Dina, who in turn reveals she is pregnant. The next day, Ellie pursues Tommy alone and encounters Jesse (Stephen Chang), Dina's ex-boyfriend, who followed them to Seattle. While searching for Abby's friend, Nora Harris (Chelsea Tavares), Ellie encounters the Seraphites, a religious cult locked in a battle with the WLF over control of Seattle. Ellie tracks down Nora and tortures her for information on Abby's location, which traumatizes Ellie. The following day, she kills two more members of Abby's group, the pregnant Mel (Ashly Burch) and her boyfriend Owen Moore (Patrick Fugit). A flashback reveals that, two years earlier, Ellie traveled to the Firefly hospital in Salt Lake City and learned the truth. Devastated, she cut ties with Joel. In the present, Ellie's group is ambushed by Abby, who kills Jesse and holds Tommy hostage.

Three days earlier, Abby learns that Owen, her ex-boyfriend, has gone missing while investigating Seraphite activity. Abby searches for Owen and is captured by the Seraphites. She is rescued by Yara (Victoria Grace) and Lev (Ian Alexander), Seraphite siblings who have been branded apostates after Lev defied Seraphite traditions. Though Yara suffers a broken arm, Abby leaves them to find Owen who, disillusioned with the war, plans to sail to Santa Barbara, California, where the Fireflies may be regrouping. Abby returns to rescue Yara and Lev, and travels across Seattle with Lev to retrieve medical supplies from the WLF hospital so Mel can amputate Yara's arm. After the surgery, Lev runs away to convince his devout mother to leave the Seraphite cult, forcing Abby and Yara to pursue him. They find him in the Seraphite settlement, where Lev has accidentally killed his mother in self-defense. The trio flee as the WLF begins an assault on the Seraphites. Abby betrays the WLF to save Lev, and Yara sacrifices herself to allow Abby and Lev to escape. The pair return to find Owen and Mel dead and a map left by Ellie leading to her hideout. An enraged Abby shoots Tommy, impairing him, and brawls with Ellie and Dina, overpowering them. At Lev's insistence, Abby spares them and tells them to leave Seattle.

Several months later, Ellie and Dina are living on a farm, raising Dina and Jesse's son, though Ellie suffers from post-traumatic stress. When Tommy arrives with information on Abby's whereabouts, Ellie leaves to find her, despite Dina's pleas to stay. Abby and Lev arrive in Santa Barbara searching for the Fireflies, who they discover are regrouping at Catalina Island, California, but are captured, tortured, and left to die by the slave-keeping Rattlers. Ellie arrives at Santa Barbara and rescues the pair. Threatening to kill Lev, Ellie forces Abby to fight her, during which Abby bites off two of Ellie's fingers. Ellie overpowers and nearly drowns her, but has a change of heart after having a flashback of Joel, and ultimately spares her. Abby and Lev sail to the Fireflies. Ellie returns to the farmhouse and finds it empty. She tries to play Joel's guitar with her damaged hand, recalls her last conversation with Joel in which she expressed her willingness to forgive him, and leaves.

Development 

Early story concepts for The Last of Us Part II were conceived during the development of The Last of Us in 2013. Naughty Dog began development in 2014, soon after the release of The Last of Us Remastered. By August 2017, with the release of Uncharted: The Lost Legacy, the entire 350-person team at Naughty Dog had shifted to develop Part II. Neil Druckmann led development as creative director and writer, reprising his role from The Last of Us and Uncharted 4: A Thief's End (2016). Anthony Newman and Kurt Margenau were selected to be co-game directors for Part II, overseeing gameplay elements such as level design and mechanics. For the final months of development, due to the COVID-19 pandemic, the team operated via remote work arrangements. In total, approximately 2,169 developers across 14 studios worked on the game.

Druckmann wrote the story with Halley Gross. The team experimented with different plot structures and considered scrapping the project until they settled on an idea that mirrored the first game; Druckmann said that whereas The Last of Us is about the extreme measures one would take for love, Part II is more about how far one would go to bring justice for those they love. The themes of revenge and retribution were inspired by Druckmann's experiences growing up in Israel, where violence was a frequent topic. He recalled watching footage of the 2000 Ramallah lynching, and how, after hearing the cheering crowds, his mind turned to violent thoughts about bringing the perpetrators to justice. He wanted the player to feel a "thirst for revenge" before making them realize the reality of their actions. Druckmann said other themes include tribalism, trauma, and the pursuit of justice. Artists at Naughty Dog traveled to Seattle to analyze the architecture, vegetation, materials, topography, lighting, and capture photorealistic textures.

Ashley Johnson and Troy Baker reprise their roles as Ellie and Joel, respectively, while Laura Bailey was cast as Abby. The actors' performances were recorded at a studio in Playa Vista, Los Angeles using performance capture, recording motion and voice simultaneously. Gross noted that a goal of the writers was to "create the most multifaceted characters you've seen in games". She particularly wanted to explore the multifaceted behavior of Ellie, showing her power as well as her insecurities. The change of player character from Ellie to Abby was inspired by the change from Joel to Ellie in the first game, though emphasized in Part II due to its focus on empathy. Druckmann wanted the player to hate Abby early in the game, but later empathize with her.

The developers pushed the technical capabilities of the PlayStation 4 when creating Part II, adding more enemies and larger environments than in previous games. Druckmann noted that any drops in detail would ruin the sense of authenticity, which required consistent optimization of the technology. Improved artificial intelligence (AI) allowed for deeper connections with characters and the creation of bonds through gameplay. The Last of Us Part II was originally planned as an open world game with hub worlds, but later game transferred to a more linear style as it better served the narrative. Naughty Dog wanted to increase the accessibility options introduced in Uncharted 4 to ensure that all players could complete the story, and the developers attended conferences and worked with advocates.

Gustavo Santaolalla returned to compose and perform the game's score, as he had done with the first game, while Mac Quayle contributed to combat music. The developers received permission to use the songs "Future Days" by Pearl Jam and "Take On Me" by A-ha. To achieve the sound of the Shamblers, the team hired voice actors Raul Ceballos and Steve Blum, and used items such as grapefruits to create the explosion sounds. The dialogue team referenced whistled languages such as Sfryria and Silbo Gomero for the Seraphites' whistling, and hired actors Stevie Mack and Lisa Marie to provide the whistles in three styles.

According to a report by Kotakus Jason Schreier, the development included a crunch schedule of 12-hour work days. This continued after the game was delayed. Schreier suggested that development was slowed due to the enormous turnover of employees following the development of Uncharted 4, with few veterans left on the team. Some of the developers allegedly hoped that Part II would fail and prove that the working conditions were not viable. Publisher Sony Interactive Entertainment granted Naughty Dog an additional two weeks of development for bug fixes. Druckmann felt that he had failed to find the correct balance for employees on Part II, and said the studio would receive external assistance for future projects.

Release and promotion 

The Last of Us Part II was announced at the PlayStation Experience event on December 3, 2016. At E3 2018, Druckmann said that Naughty Dog was refusing to announce a release date until the game was "very close to release", to avoid disappointing fans. During Sony's State of Play presentation on September 24, 2019, Naughty Dog announced a release date of February 21, 2020. On October 25, Druckmann announced a delay to May 29, 2020, to "bring the entire game up to a level of polish we would call Naughty Dog quality". On April 2, 2020, Sony announced that the game was almost complete but had been indefinitely delayed to due to logistical problems caused by the COVID-19 pandemic. In late April, several videos leaked online, showing cutscenes, gameplay, and significant plot details. Druckmann tweeted that he was "heartbroken" for fans and for the team, who had devoted years to development. On April 27, Sony announced a release date of June 19, 2020.

The first trailer was released alongside the announcement, showcasing the return of Ellie and Joel. The second trailer, released in October 2017 as a part of Paris Games Week, revealed Abby, Yara, and Lev. Dina and Jesse were first shown in a presentation at E3 2018. A trailer was featured in Sony's State of Play presentation in September 2019, which preceded additional marketing to celebrate Outbreak Week—the week in which the fictional outbreak occurred in the original game. A story trailer was released on May 6, followed by an animated commercial on June 3, and the final pre-launch trailer on June 10. Naughty Dog replaced and altered characters in the trailers to conceal story events; Druckmann cited the marketing of Metal Gear Solid 2: Sons of Liberty (2001), which concealed its protagonist in trailers, as an influence.

Naughty Dog announced the special edition versions in September 2019. The game was featured in its own standalone State of Play presentation on May 27. From May 13 to June 3, Naughty Dog released a series of videos about the development. The game was banned in Saudi Arabia and the United Arab Emirates, attributed to the countries' conservative traditions regarding homosexuality. An update on August 13 added a permadeath mode, a new difficulty level, and gameplay modifiers. For The Last of Us Day in September 2020, Naughty Dog announced new merchandise for the game, including a vinyl soundtrack, board game, statues, and posters. A performance update was released on May 19, 2021, allowing gameplay at 60 frames per second on the PlayStation 5.

Reception

Critical response 

The Last of Us Part II received "universal acclaim" from critics, according to review aggregator Metacritic. It was praised for its improved gameplay, graphical fidelity, cast performances, characters, audio design, and music, though critics were divided on its narrative and themes. Jonathon Dornbush of IGN called it "a masterpiece worthy of its predecessor" and wrote that "it delivers a layered, emotionally shattering story on top of stealth and action gameplay that improves the first game's mechanics [... and] still makes time for a stunning, nuanced exploration of the strength and fragility of the human spirit". Game Informers Andy McNamara concurred, calling it "the best narrative game I have played" and "a sequel unlike any other, taking video game storytelling to new heights." Kaity Kline of NPR wrote that it "made me very aware of the little things in my life that I take for granted, the kinds of things you don't appreciate until they're ripped away forever". GameSpots Kallie Plagge called it "beautiful and devastating", and wrote that "the more I reflect on it, the more I appreciate the story and characters at its core".

Game Informers McNamara felt that the writers conveyed the themes "with careful nuance and unflinching emotion". Destructoids Chris Carter and VG247s Kirk McKeand applauded the use of minor dialogue to echo the themes. Sammy Barker of Push Square particularly praised the use of flashback and overlapping stories; The Guardians Keza MacDonald concurred, describing the narrative as "emotionally effective". Conversely, GameRevolutions Michael Leri thought that the flashbacks were evidence of pacing problems. Alex Avard of GamesRadar+ felt that the narrative lost its momentum during its need to finalize every story thread. USgamers Kat Bailey found the latter half slow, and that the game was five hours "too long". Bailey also criticized the dissonance between the statement against violence and its necessity during gameplay. Polygons Maddy Myers and Kotakus Riley MacLeod wrote that the game repeatedly delivered its themes without allowing the player any agency in their decisions. Rob Zacny of Vice wrote that, despite the amount of narrative moments, "it doesn't have much to say". Also writing for Vice, Emanuel Maiberg wrote that the attempts to parallel the Israeli–Palestinian conflict through the WLF and Seraphites were poor, particularly in its allegorical representation of two equal sides.

McKeand of VG247 described every character as "complex and human". Destructoids Carter felt empathetic to the main characters, a sentiment echoed by IGNs Dornbush, who found Ellie's development particularly "riveting". Andrew Webster of The Verge praised the relationship between Ellie and Dina, though noted some dissonance in Ellie's behavior between gameplay and cutscenes. GameSpots Plagge wrote that Abby's characterization led to a deeper connection to her than to Ellie, but found her character development incongruous with her "onslaught of combat against human enemies". Kotakus MacLeod and VentureBeats Dean Takahashi appreciated the diversity of characters; Oli Welsh of Eurogamer praised the representation of female and LGBT characters, calling it "a game about women". NPRs Kline lauded the game's ability to "connect with every character, not just the main characters". Push Squares Barker wrote that the supporting characters "establish themselves extremely swiftly", and Game Informers McNamara found their occasional absence alarming, having grown close to them. Conversely, some critics felt that the new supporting characters lacked the higher quality of the main characters and of Naughty Dog's previous work; Yannick Le Fur of Jeuxvideo.com wrote that characters such as Jesse and Manny were simply used to advance the narrative. Polygons Myers and Vices Zacny criticized the characters' inability to learn from their mistakes.

Critics praised the cast's performances, particularly that of Ashley Johnson, Troy Baker, and Laura Bailey. Welsh of Eurogamer found Johnson's performance as Ellie to be "standout" due to her depiction of "rawness, vulnerability, and rage". GamesRadar+s Avard considered Johnson's portrayal of suffering "nothing short of awards worthy", and found that Baker "steals some of Part 2s best scenes as Joel" by adding complexities that enrich the character and relationships. Dornbush of IGN wrote that Johnson added nuance to every element of Ellie, and commended Woodward's performance as Dina, especially during quieter moments. VG247s McKeand found that the performances made the narrative more powerful.

Avard of GamesRadar+ felt that the new gameplay mechanics were added with a level of care to ensure an authenticity that Naughty Dog is known for. GameRevolutions Leri lauded the cohesiveness between gameplay and narrative, and the former's ability to create empathy. Plagge of GameSpot appreciated the intensity of combat and wrote that "Ellie's movements are smooth enough that they almost look scripted". VentureBeats Takahashi found the combat more diverse than its predecessor's. IGNs Dornbush similarly felt that the combat gameplay and puzzle elements had been improved, praising the intelligence and variation of enemies. Avard of GamesRadar+ described the enemy AI as "some of the most advanced" of any game. McKeand of VG247 considered the level design better than other Naughty Dog games, and McNamara of Game Informer felt that it improved combat scenarios. The Verges Webster admired the action but noted some "awkward moments when [it] attempts to cover its video game-ness". Polygons Myers found the combat an unsubtle messenger for its statement on violence; Kotakus MacLeod  wrote that the "pace of the combat sometimes felt like punishment".

Many critics felt the graphics were among the best of any PlayStation 4 game. Kotakus MacLeod wrote that the nature in Seattle is "gorgeous and awe-inspiring", and Push Squares Barker declared the art department "among the best in the industry". The Guardians MacDonald described the graphics as "meticulous and astounding". Dornbush of IGN appreciated the world's ability to tell additional stories. GameRevolutions Leri considered the environments more realistic than the first game's, and praised the technical elements, such as frame rate, lack of load times, and realistic lighting. Carter of Destructoid felt that the seamless animation of minor facial expressions humanized the characters to a new level. McNamara of Game Informer similarly lauded the realistic-looking characters.  VentureBeats Takahashi commended the improvements to Naughty Dog's already impressive engine. Zacny of Vice found Seattle too similar to Boston and Pittsburgh from the first game, and Christopher Byrd of The Washington Post wondered if the detail was worth the "human cost" of Naughty Dog's crunch culture.

Barker of Push Square described the sound design as "stunning", identifying the 3D audio as a technical feat he would not have expected until PlayStation 5. Vices Zacny found that the audio design made settings feel more lifelike in a way that the visuals occasionally failed to do. IGNs Dornbush similarly felt that the sounds added realism, and praised Santaolalla's "moving" score. McNamara of Game Informer found that the music added tension. Kevin Dunsmore of Hardcore Gamer wrote that the "haunting and subtle melodies blend into the world seamlessly". Eurogamers Welsh praised the score for its combination of banjo and electronics.

Audience response 
The game was the subject of review bombing on Metacritic, resulting in a user review score of 3.4/10 at its nadir. Reporters noticed the review bombing occurred shortly after the game launched, too early for users to feasibly have finished it; some suggested that the reviews were based on the incomplete plot leaks. Many of the negative reviews criticized the characterization and plot; some complained of "social justice warrior" politics, with vitriolic responses to LGBT characters. CNETs Daniel Van Boom wrote that the review bombers did not represent the majority of players, while Kotakus MacLeod identified thousands of positive user reviews; the latter wrote that Metacritic's opaque system, which emphasizes scores over critique, comprised only "a bunch of meaningless numbers and a lot of rage".

Some players criticized Joel's death in the opening hours, perceiving a discrepancy between his cautious nature in the first game and his more trustful and protective attitude in Part II. Den of Geeks Matthew Byrd wrote that Joel had protected young women in the past, so his trusting of Abby in Part II was not "entirely unreasonable". Sam Clench of News.com.au also argued that Joel's time in Jackson had realistically made him less cynical over the years. A number of players considered Joel's brutal and undignified death "disrespectful"; Clench rebutted that it was realistic, as most real deaths occur at unfortunate times, and described the scene as "extremely strong, purposeful writing". Josh Hawkins of Shacknews wrote that Joel's death was a fitting retribution for his brutal actions and murders. Some players felt the marketing, which had altered and replaced characters in trailers to conceal Joel's death and Abby's role, was intentionally deceptive; Druckmann responded that Naughty Dog had intended to preserve the game experience, "not to bamboozle anyone or get their $60".

A subset of players criticized Abby and disapproved of her playable chapters as they had expected to control Ellie for the majority of the game. Colliders Dave Trumbore felt Abby had been unfairly maligned by audiences who had failed to understand the story's message. Some players criticized Abby's muscular physique, and theories spread online that she was transgender; The Independents Amy Coles and Polygons Patricia Hernandez argued that this perception was a result of the lack of body diversity in games, and that the story showed Abby had the resources to achieve her physique. Coles observed that these arguments were propagated by "a loud and determinedly misogynistic subset" of players. Laura Bailey, who played Abby, became the target of online death threats in response to the character; Naughty Dog released a statement condemning the threats, and Bailey was supported by James Gunn, Ashley Johnson, and Craig Mazin, among others.

Some members of the transgender community objected to the representation of Lev, a transgender supporting character. Criticism focused on villains using Lev's deadname, that the character was created by cisgender writers, and the use of trans stories as tragedies. Stacey Henley of VG247 responded that Lev's deadname is used sparingly and that Ian Alexander, a transgender actor, provides the character's voice and motion capture. Writing for Paste, Waverly praised the choice to have Lev played by a transgender actor, but felt there was too much emphasis on his gender identity and the suffering he experienced for it. Waverly felt that "Lev's story isn't made for trans people, but to give cisgender players a space to connect with their guilt and pity for trans people". Henley wrote that, while Lev's story is imperfect, it is "a major step for trans characters in gaming, [and] focuses on a highly charismatic and central character who is far more than this transness". Kotakus MacLeod saw Lev's character as simply a way of acknowledging that trans people exist in the game's universe and wrote that it was up to the player to create their own meaning from the character. Alexander acknowledged the writers "might have missed the mark a little bit" regarding the use of Lev's deadname but felt Abby's response reflected the importance of allowing trans individuals the agency to discuss their gender on their own terms.

A year after the game's release, Colliders Trumbore identified a subset of players continued to criticize the game and its legacy, comparing it to some audience complaints about Star Wars: The Last Jedi (2017), though recognized it was "quieter" than at launch. In July 2021, a user of a subreddit focused on denouncing Part II claimed they received death threats from fans of YouTube channel Girlfriend Reviews, who had posted positive videos about the game; following target harassment from the subreddit, Girlfriend Reviews discovered the threats were fabricated by the user.

Developer response 
Polygons Hernandez observed that the discourse surrounding The Last of Us Part II had become adversarial, with "bigots" attacking the game for its diverse cast and Naughty Dog becoming defensive. Vices Zacny claimed that, in response to his critical review, Sony contacted him on behalf of Naughty Dog to discuss his criticisms, which they disagreed with; Zacny said the discussion, while cordial, was unusual from a large publisher. On Twitter, Druckmann expressed disapproval for journalist Jason Schreier after he mocked a comparison of Part II to the 1993 film Schindler's List. Baker responded to another comment from Schreier, that "video games are too long", with a quote from US president Theodore Roosevelt about critics being less valuable than creators. Hernandez concluded that this was "not an environment that is conducive to encouraging honest reviews or critical discussion, which is ultimately a disservice to the game itself". Bailey of USgamer wrote that the strict review embargo prevented meaningful discussion of the narrative. Druckmann acknowledged that the embargo had been enforced as a result of the plot leaks, as he had felt that reviews discussing plot details would have become more harmful and widespread than the leaks themselves.

Accolades 

The Last of Us Part II won more than 320 Game of the Year awards, which several outlets claimed broke the record set by The Witcher 3: Wild Hunt (2015); it was later surpassed by Elden Ring (2022). The game was awarded from outlets and shows such as Den of Geek, Digital Trends, Electronic Gaming Monthly, Empire, Entertainment Weekly, Game Informer, PlayStation Blog, Push Square, and the Titanium Awards. It was named runner-up by several other publications. The Last of Us Part II was ranked among the best games of its generation by Game Informer, GamesRadar, and IGN. At the 38th Golden Joystick Awards in November 2020, it won all six awards for which it was nominated: Ultimate Game of the Year, Best Audio, Best Storytelling, Best Visual Design, PlayStation Game of the Year, and Studio of the Year for Naughty Dog. It led the nominees for The Game Awards 2020 with 11 nominations, of which it won seven, the most in the show's history: Game of the Year, Best Game Direction, Best Narrative, Best Audio Design, Innovation in Accessibility, Best Action/Adventure, and Best Performance (for Bailey).

The Last of Us Part II was nominated for 24 awards at the National Academy of Video Game Trade Reviewers Awards, the most in the show's history; it won eight, including Outstanding Direction in a Game Cinema, Franchise Adventure Game, Lead Performance in a Drama (for Johnson and Bailey), and Supporting Performance in a Drama (for Baker). It was nominated for 13 awards at the 17th British Academy Games Awards, the most in the show's history, winning for Animation, the publicly-voted EE Game of the Year, and Performer in a Leading Role (for Bailey). It led the nominees at the 24th Annual D.I.C.E. Awards with 11 nominations, of which it won two: Outstanding Achievement in Animation and Outstanding Achievement in Story. It also led the 19th Annual Game Audio Network Guild Awards with 15 nominations and eight wins, and the 21st Game Developers Choice Awards with six nominations, of which it won one. It received the most nominations at the inaugural Global Industry Game Awards with 13, of which it won three: 3D Animation, Cinematography, and Story.

Sales 
In its release weekend, The Last of Us Part II sold over four million copies worldwide, becoming the fastest-selling PlayStation 4 exclusive, beating Marvel's Spider-Mans 3.3million and God of Wars 3.1million in the same period. It had the biggest launch of 2020 for both physical and digital sales. On the PlayStation Store, it was the most-downloaded PlayStation 4 game in North America and Europe in June; in July, it was fifth in North America and tenth in Europe; in November, it was the eighth in North America and seventh in Europe; and overall for 2020, it ranked sixth in North America and eighth in Europe. In the United States, it was the best-selling game of June 2020 and became the third-best-selling game of the year within two weeks, generating the highest first-month sales of the year. By August 2020, it had become the third-highest-grossing PlayStation game in the United States, behind Marvel's Spider-Man and God of War. Overall, it was the sixth-best-selling game of the year in the United States; it was the third-best-selling for PlayStation consoles, and the best-selling PlayStation 4-only game. By June 2022, the game had sold through over ten million copies worldwide.

In the United Kingdom, The Last of Us Part II became the fastest-selling physical PlayStation 4 game, outselling previous record holder Uncharted 4 by at least one percent and The Last of Us by 76 percent; it was the nation's eighth-best-selling game of the year with 543,218 copies sold, and the seventh for physical sales. A price discount in February 2021 saw it re-enter the UK physical charts in third place, representing a 3,992 percent increase. In Japan, The Last of Us Part II was the best-selling game during its first week, selling an estimated 178,696 physical copies. In Germany, it sold over 200,000 copies in June 2020 and 500,000 by December 2020. In Australia, it was the eighth-best-selling of the year, and the third for physical sales.

Legacy 
The Last of Us Part II is expected to be adapted into multiple seasons of the television adaption of The Last of Us, starting with the green-lit second season. Druckmann and series co-creator Craig Mazin wanted to avoid filler between the seasons, jumping into adapting the sequel immediately.

Notes

References

External links 

 
 
 

2020 video games
2020s horror video games
Action-adventure games
The Game Award for Game of the Year winners
GLAAD Media Award for Outstanding Video Game winners
Golden Joystick Award for Game of the Year winners
The Last of Us
LGBT-related video games
Naughty Dog games
PlayStation 4 games
PlayStation 4 Pro enhanced games
PlayStation 4-only games
Post-apocalyptic video games
Post-traumatic stress disorder in fiction
Single-player video games
Sony Interactive Entertainment games
Stealth video games
Survival video games
Third-person shooters
Transgender-related video games
Video game controversies
Video game sequels
Video games about cults
Video games about revenge
Video games about slavery
Video games about viral outbreaks
Video games about zombies
Video games developed in the United States
Video games featuring female protagonists
Video games postponed due to the COVID-19 pandemic
Video games scored by Gustavo Santaolalla
Video games set in California
Video games set in Seattle
Video games set in the 2030s
Video games set in Utah
Video games set in Wyoming
Video games written by Neil Druckmann